Anastrolos is a genus of moths in the family Lasiocampidae. The genus was erected by Fletcher in 1982. All species are found in Australia.

Species
Based on Lepidoptera and Some Other Life Forms:
Anastrolos apasta (Turner, 1924)
Anastrolos zoristis (Turner, 1924)
Anastrolos holopolia (Turner, 1924)
Anastrolos porphyrica (Turner, 1941)

External links

Lasiocampidae
Moth genera